Bobrovo is the name of several rural localities in Russia:
Bobrovo (village, Primorsky District, Arkhangelsk Oblast), a village in Koskogorskoye Rural Settlement of Primorsky District, Arkhangelsk Oblast
Bobrovo (settlement, Primorsky District, Arkhangelsk Oblast), a settlement in Bobrovo-Lyavlenskoye Rural Settlement of Primorsky District, Arkhangelsk Oblast